Shireta Brahimi (born 4 October 1982) is a Macedonian football midfielder currently playing for ŽFK Naše Taksi in the Macedonian Championship. Born in Yugoslavia, she has played the Champions League with ZFK Skiponjat and Nase Taksi, and she is a member of the North Macedonian national team.

References

1982 births
Living people
Women's association football midfielders
Macedonian women's footballers
North Macedonia women's international footballers
Albanian footballers from North Macedonia